A list of films produced in Spain in 1970 (see 1970 in film).

1970

Notes

External links
 Spanish films of 1970 at the Internet Movie Database

1970
Spanish
Films